Sir Henry Hobart, 4th Baronet (1657–1698) was an English Whig politician and baronet.

Family

Henry Hobart was the eldest son to Sir John Hobart, 3rd Baronet and his first wife Mary Hampden, daughter to John Hampden. He was knighted at Blickling by King Charles II of England in 1671 and succeeded his father as baronet in 1683.

Hobart was educated at St John's College, Cambridge.

On 9 July 1684, he married Elizabeth Maynard, eldest daughter to Sir Joseph Maynard, and had by her a son and three daughters. His eldest daughter Henrietta was a mistress of King George II of Great Britain. The second daughter Catherine married Lieutenant-General Charles Churchill. Lady Hobart died in 1701.

Hobart was succeeded in the baronetcy by his son John, later raised to the peerage as Earl of Buckinghamshire.

Career
Henry Hobart was Gentleman of the Horse to King William III of England and fought under him in the Battle of the Boyne, and a year later was appointed Vice-Admiral of Norfolk.

Hobart was a Member of parliament for King's Lynn in the English House of Commons between 1681 and 1685. He represented Thetford from January to February 1689 and subsequently Norfolk until 1690. In 1694, he was elected for Bere Alston, a seat he held until the following year, when he was returned again for Norfolk until the July–August 1698 election, which he fought and lost.

Death

On 20 August, after the 1698 election, Hobart fought a duel with Oliver Le Neve on Cawston Heath, and was mortally wounded. Le Neve of Witchingham Hall, Great Witchingham, fought left-handed and was wounded in the arm by Hobart who had a reputation as a good swordsman. However, Le Neve struck back and injured his opponent so badly that he died the next day at Blickling. As there were no seconds or witnesses, the duel was illegal. Le Neve fled to Holland but returned to England two years later, when he was tried and acquitted. Hobart was buried in the Blickling family vault.
A plinth with an urn, called the Duel Stone, which commemorates the duel, stands in a National Trust plot on Norwich Road in Cawston.

References

|-

1650s births
1698 deaths

Year of birth uncertain
Baronets in the Baronetage of England
Duelling fatalities
English admirals
Williamite military personnel of the Williamite War in Ireland
Henry
English MPs 1681
English MPs 1689–1690
English MPs 1690–1695
English MPs 1695–1698
Alumni of St John's College, Cambridge
People from Blickling
Members of Parliament for Norfolk
Members of the Parliament of England for Bere Alston
English duellists